Negroc (in Albanian) or Negrovce is a village in the Glogovac municipality of Kosovo.

Notes

References

Villages in Drenas